Matthew Alan Jardine (born December 9th, 1966) is an American musician, best known for his work as a vocalist and percussionist for the Beach Boys and Brian Wilson. He is the son of original Beach Boy Al Jardine.

Biography
Jardine is the son of longtime, and original Beach Boys guitarist Al Jardine. His first major recording was at the age of 11 and was the narration of the Beach Boys' recording of   "(I Saw Santa) Rockin' Around The Christmas Tree" from the album Christmas with the Beach Boys. Jardine, alongside the other Beach Boys' children (the "Adam" referred to in the narration was his younger brother, Adam Jardine, age six), sang the background vocals on this song.

During the 1980s, Jardine spent time on the road with the Beach Boys as a gofer to earn money. This led to an assistant road manager job in the summer of 1988, which he retained until Carl Wilson asked if he could play percussion onstage while continuing his other duties. During this tour Jardine was asked to sing background vocals on a part-time basis filling in for other vocalists in the band, whose voices had grown tired due to the band's year-round touring schedule.

In 1991, Jardine auditioned for the band and earned a spot in the band as a lead and falsetto vocalist, background singer and percussionist. He toured with the Beach Boys from 1990 through 1998, performing on three of their studio albums.  Jardine sang Brian Wilson's original falsetto vocals on tour; these songs included "Warmth of the Sun", "Don't Worry Baby", and "Hushabye". He has appeared in nine Beach Boys' music videos and made numerous TV appearances. During the latter part of his time with the Beach Boys, Jardine also worked extensively with Mike Love's California Beach Band.  He also toured with Jan and Dean for numerous shows and events.

In 1998, Jardine was asked to perform with Brian Wilson on TNT's Front Row and Center as well as Farm Aid '98. Wilson was quoted as saying of Jardine in Billboard magazine, "I hear him from behind the stage.  His voice is stronger than mine, and he can actually hit those high notes."

Jardine later went on the road with Brian's daughters Carnie and Wendy Wilson and friend Chynna Phillips, the multi-platinum trio Wilson Phillips, to help them promote their California album. Carnie and Wendy not only were childhood friends but also had worked with Jardine and his father while touring as Alan Jardine's Family and Friends following their departure from the Beach Boys touring band in 1998. Jardine has continued to tour with his father and the Surf City All-Stars. In 2014, he was asked to join the Brian Wilson touring band, replacing Jeff Foskett; he accepted.

Discography

The Beach Boys
M.I.U. Album (1978) 
Come Go With Me (single) (1981)
Still Cruisin' (1989)
Summer in Paradise (1992)
Stars and Stripes Vol. 1 (1996)
Songs from Here & Back (2006)
Don’t Fight the Sea (single) (credited to Al Jardine with The Beach Boys) (2011)

Al Jardine
Live in Las Vegas (2001)
A Postcard from California (2010)

Brian Wilson
No Pier Pressure (2015)

References 

Living people
The Beach Boys backing band members
1966 births